Dirty Story: A Further Account of the Life and Adventures of Arthur Abdel Simpson is a 1967 novel by Eric Ambler. It was also published as This Gun for Hire.

The book continues the life of Ambler's anti-hero, petty criminal Arthur Abdel Simpson, a man whose English father and Egyptian mother have given him uncertain citizenship. Simpson took part in a daring Istanbul robbery in Ambler's earlier novel The Light of Day.

In Dirty Story Simpson faces the prospect of becoming a penniless exile, a non-citizen of any country. He is forced to become a mercenary for a cynical Central African mining company seeking to secure control of land rich in rare earth ores. He is a misfit with little military experience and is unsuited for the role of mercenary; however, he manages to outwit his ruthless adversaries who are seasoned professionals.

This is one of several novels by Ambler in which statelessness or the danger of becoming stateless (an exile, not a citizen of any country and unwelcome in all countries) features prominently in the plot.

It was nominated for the 1967 Gold Dagger award.

References 

English thriller novels
Novels by Eric Ambler
1967 British novels
The Bodley Head books